The unit cost is the price incurred by a company to produce, store and sell one unit of a particular product. Unit costs include all fixed costs and all variable costs involved in production. Cost unit is a form of measurement of volume of production or service.

Cost unit vs unit cost

Cost unit is the standard unit for buying the minimum of any product. Unit cost is the minimum cost for buying any standard unit.

References

Costs